5601 Squadron, also known as Manat (an acronym for Merkaz Nisu'ey Tisa, lit. Flight Test Center), is the Israeli Air Force unit responsible for flight and weapons testing, airframe modification and avionics integration.

Although formed in 1978, Manat may have its origins in a flight test unit established as early as March 1950. Based at Tel Nof, Manat comprises a flight section, including test pilots and flight testing engineers, a technical section charged with aircraft maintenance, an avionics section, and a UAV section operating from Palmachim. The squadron operates a fully instrumented example of every Israeli Air Force frontline combat aircraft type on strength at any time. It also operates a number of UAVs and will utilize helicopter and transport types from other squadrons when necessary.

Among the aircraft currently operated by Manat are three F-16 Fighting Falcons, representing the different variants of the aircraft in service: F-16D Block 30 #020, F-16D Block 40 #601 and F-16I Block 52+ #401. F-16D #601, designated CK-1, was designed by Lockheed to meet specific flight test requirements. Another aircraft operated by the squadron is F-15I #201 (94-0286), the very first F-15I built. Manat has also participated in the evaluation of foreign aircraft types, including the Syrian MiG-23 whose pilot defected to Israel in October 1989 and a pair of MiG-29s loaned from a European air force in 1995. During its stay in Israel, one of the MiG-29s even carried the squadron emblem.

The squadron works closely with Israel's defence industries and participates in product testing. Among the projects the squadron was involved with are the various Python missiles, the Popeye II, and the Rafael Spice.

See also 
 List of aerospace flight test centres
 Shimshon Rozen

External links 
Flight Test Center photo gallery by Nir Ben-Yosef

References 

Israeli Air Force squadrons